Ditrigona pentesticha is a moth in the family Drepanidae. It was described by Hong-Fu Chu and Lin-Yao Wang in 1987. It is found in China.

References

Moths described in 1987
Drepaninae
Moths of Asia